Saga of a Hoodlum is the second album by the hip-hop artist Tragedy Khadafi, then known by the stage name Intelligent Hoodlum.

Track listing

Samples
Shalom a Leck
"Piano Man" by Billy Joel
"I Like It" by The Emotions 
"Long Red" by Mountain

Underground
"Pot Belly" by Lou Donaldson
"Cold Feet" by Albert King
"Get Up, Get Into It, Get Involved" by James Brown

Funk Mode
"I Like It" by The Emotions
"Do the Funky Penguin (Part 2)" by Rufus Thomas 
"It's Your Thing" by Lou Donaldson 
"Public Enemy No. 1" by Public Enemy 
"Jam 4 U" by Redman

Grand Groove
"Ike's Mood I" by Isaac Hayes 
"Hollywood's World" by DJ Hollywood
"Sing a Simple Song" by Booker T. & the M.G.'s 
"The Rebel" by Marley Marl

At Large
"Do or Die Bed Sty" by Divine Sounds 
"Dizzy" by Tommy Roe 
"Sing a Simple Song" by Sly & the Family Stone 
"Warm It Up, Kane" by Big Daddy Kane

Death Row
"Hundred 'An One Year/M'Ria" by Cannonball Adderley
"Zimba Ku" by Black Heat
"Bring the Noise" by Public Enemy

Mad Brothers Know His Name
"Shades of Difference" by LaBelle
"Just to Get a Rep" by Gang Starr
"Don't Change Your Love" by The Five Stairsteps 
"You Can Call Me Rover" by The Main Ingredient

Pass the Teck
"Rapper's Delight" by Sugarhill Gang
"Curtis' Song" by Lou Donaldson
"School Boy Crush" by Average White Band 
"Spinning Wheel" by Lonnie Smith 
"It's Your Thing" by Lou Donaldson

Street Life
"Little Willie Armstrong Jones" by The Last Poets
"Sneakin' in the Back" by Tom Scott and L.A. Express

Pump the Funk
"Blind Alley" by The Emotions
"Sing a Simple Song" by Sly & the Family Stone
"Do the Funky Penguin (Part 2)" by Rufus Thomas
"Alwayz Into Somethin'" by N.W.A

Role Model
"Synthetic Substitution" by Melvin Bliss

Grand Groove (Bonus Mix)
"It's a New Day" by Skull Snaps
"Remind Me" by Patrice Rushen

Funky Roll Outro
"Synthetic Substitution" by Melvin Bliss 
"Uphill Peace of Mind" by Kid Dynamite

Chart positions

References

External links
"Street Life (Return Of The Life Remix) music video
"Grand Groove" music video

1993 albums
Tragedy Khadafi albums
A&M Records albums
Albums produced by Marley Marl
Albums produced by K-Def